These are the results of the boxing competition at the 1920 Summer Olympics in Antwerp.  Medals were awarded in eight weight classes. The competitions were held from 21 to 24 August.

Participating nations
A total of 116 boxers from 12 nations competed at the Antwerp Games:

Medal summary

Medal table

References

External links
 International Olympic Committee medal database

 
1920 Summer Olympics events
1920
1920 in boxing